Ettie Annie Rout (24 February 1877 – 17 September 1936) was a Tasmanian-born New Zealander whose work among servicemen in Paris and the Somme during World War I made her a war hero among the French, yet through the same events she became persona non grata in New Zealand. She married Frederick Hornibrook on 3 May 1920, after which she was Ettie Hornibrook. They had no children and later separated. She died in 1936, and was buried in the Cook Islands.

Life
She was born in Launceston, Tasmania, Australia, but she was raised in Wellington, New Zealand from 1884. After leaving school, she became a shorthand typist for commissions of inquiry and later the Supreme Court (now the High Court, not to be confused with the present Supreme Court). Biographers believe this job gave her a wide range of experiences on social issues. She was later a reporter, businessperson, writer and a campaigner on sexually transmitted infections.

After founding a volunteer nursing group during World War I, the New Zealand Volunteer Sisterhood, Rout was made aware of the prevalence of STI among servicemen. By 1917, the New Zealand Army had made free distribution of her safe sex kit compulsory. It was for her work inspecting brothels in Paris and in the Somme, that she was decorated by the French. In 1917 she and several other New Zealand nurses were Mentioned in Despatches by General Sir Archibald Murray.

In New Zealand, her exploits were considered such that her name, on pain of a £100 fine, could not be published. However, her activities could be published.

Similar ironies were found overseas—her 1922 book, Safe Marriage: A Return to Sanity, was banned in New Zealand, but published in both Australia and Britain. In the latter, it was a best-seller, yet a bishop called her "the wickedest woman in Britain". In 1922, the British Medical Journal recommended the book for medical men and women but noted that "many readers will disagree with the author's point of view, and some will feel grave misgivings about the effect of her teaching; but none can doubt the sincerity of her purpose."

Rout and her husband Frederick Arthur Hornibrook were members of Arbuthnot Lane's New Health Society.

Death and legacy
Rout died age 59 as the result of a self-administered quinine overdose in Rarotonga in the Cook Islands following her sole postwar return to New Zealand in 1936. She is interred at an Avarua church cemetery. In 1992, Jane Tolerton wrote her biography, and more recently, she has been more critically perceived as a "White Australasia" apologist in Phillippa Levine's account of contagious disease legislation within the late nineteenth century British Empire.

In 1983 an episode of the New Zealand television series Pioneer Women dramatised her story.

Selected publications

Safe Marriage: A Return to Sanity (1922)
Two Years in Paris (1923)
Maori Symbolism (1926)
Native Diet: With Numerous Practical Recipes (1926)
Whole-Meal With Practical Recipes (1927)
Stand Up and Slim Down (1934)

See also

References

Further reading
Ettie Rout: New Zealand's safer sex pioneer  (2015)

External links 
  from the Dictionary of New Zealand Biography 
 
 Restoration of Ettie Rout's grave in Rarotonga in 2012 by Dame Margaret Sparrow 
 Safe Marriage: A Return to Sanity (1922) facsimile copy, archived at ibiblio.org
 
 
Photos (downloadable) of Ettie Rout with NZEF and other soldiers in Paris, 1918 ,.

1877 births
1936 deaths
New Zealand writers
People from Launceston, Tasmania
New Zealand women in World War I
Sex educators
Australian emigrants to New Zealand